Essaouira is a province in the Moroccan region of Marrakesh-Safi. Its population in 2004 was 452,979 

The major cities and towns are: 
 Ait Daoud
 El Hanchane
 Essaouira
 Ounagha
 Smimou
 Tafetachte
 Talmest
 Tamanar

Subdivisions
The province is divided administratively into the following:

References

 
Essaouira Province